P&J Live (also known as The Event Complex Aberdeen) is a multi-purpose indoor arena in the suburb of Bucksburn, in Aberdeen in Scotland. Opened in August 2019, it offers a capacity for all types of shows and events from 5,000 to 15,000. Replacing the former Aberdeen Exhibition and Conference Centre (AECC), the 10,000-seat arena is used for concerts and other events. It is the largest indoor arena in Scotland, and the fifth largest arena in the United Kingdom.

History
In September 2012, talks got underway to replace the 27-year-old AECC Arena with a new £20 million facility on the same site amid claims that the arena was missing out on big acts due its comparatively small 4,750-seat capacity.

On 18 October 2013, the city council announced plans to spend £200 million on a rebuild of the AECC, but also raised the possibility of relocating the venue to a new site. Then on 31 October, it was announced that the go ahead had been given to the relocation, with Henry Boot as the preferred development partner. Artists impressions were released for a new centre and arena to be built at The Rowett Institute, which was owned by the University of Aberdeen and located in the city's Bucksburn area near Aberdeen Airport and close to the Aberdeen International Business Park.

The council says the project would be completed by 2019, accommodating 10,000 people seated and 12,500 standing. Other facilities include office and leisure space, plus an adjoining 4-star Hilton Aberdeen TECA hotel with options for two more. An artist's impression the new AECC was released on 1 November 2013, together with an estimate of the final bill at around £185 million.

In September 2014, public consultations took place prior to the final planning application being submitted in May 2015 for the Bucksburn site and redevelopment of the current AECC site at Bridge of Don. Construction began in July 2016, after a ground-breaking ceremony on 5 July.

The planned spending total of the new project is £333 million. In July 2018, it was announced that the new venue would be named The Event Complex Aberdeen (TECA). The official name was changed to P&J Live in May 2019, following a sponsorship deal with the venue’s operator SMG Europe and DC Thomson (owners of The Press and Journal and Evening Express).

Constructed by the Robertson Group, the main arena includes an exclusive 50 person capacity show deck, 16 private hospitality suites and a VIP lounge. The new building also contains seven conference spaces, three 2,000 sqm exhibition halls (each with a seated capacity of 1,700), eleven meeting rooms, 150-seat restaurant and a coffee shop. The development also comprises two on site hotels. The open day was held on 10 August 2019.

Events
The first event at the new arena was Offshore Europe from 3–6 September 2019. On 17 September 2019, it was announced that P&J Live would host the 2019 edition of BBC Sports Personality of the Year on 15 December. On 23 November 2019, Scottish singer Gerry Cinnamon performed a sold-out concert at the venue to a crowd of 15,000 people, making it the largest indoor concert ever held in Scotland.

In 2021, during the COVID-19 pandemic, the venue was used as a vaccination centre.

Entertainment

See also
 Aberdeen Exhibition and Conference Centre

References

External links

Redevelopment website

Buildings and structures in Aberdeen
Indoor arenas in Scotland
Exhibition and conference centres in Scotland
Event venues established in 2019
2019 establishments in Scotland